Marilyna is a genus of pufferfishes native to the western Pacific Ocean.

Species
There are currently three recognized species in this genus:
 Marilyna darwinii (Castelnau, 1873)
 Marilyna meraukensis (de Beaufort, 1955) (Merauke toadfish)
 Marilyna pleurosticta (Günther, 1872)

References

Tetraodontidae
Marine fish genera